Valea Stanciului is a commune in Dolj County, Oltenia, Romania with a population of 6,212 people. It is composed of two villages, Horezu-Poenari and Valea Stanciului.

References

Communes in Dolj County
Localities in Oltenia